Suizhou or Sui Prefecture (Chinese: Suīzhōu 綏州;) was a zhou (prefecture) in imperial China centering on modern Suide County, Shaanxi, China. It existed (intermittently) from 552 to 1069. In the 10th- and 11th-centuries it was mostly controlled by the Tangut people as part of Western Xia (1038–1227) or its precursor, the Dingnan Jiedushi, although it became Song dynasty territory again in 1067.

Geography
The administrative region of Suizhou during the Tang dynasty is in modern northern Shaanxi. It probably includes parts of modern: 
 Under the administration of Yulin:
 Suide County
 Wubu County
 Qingjian County
 Zizhou County
 Under the administration of Yan'an:
 Zichang County

References
 

Prefectures of the Sui dynasty
Prefectures of the Tang dynasty
Prefectures of the Song dynasty
Prefectures of Western Xia
Former prefectures in Shaanxi